Morgan Randyll (1649 – 1738 or later), of Chilworth Manor, Surrey was an English lawyer and Tory politician who sat in the English and British House of Commons between 1679 and 1722.

Randyll was the eldest son of Vincent Randyll of Chilworth and his wife Dorothy Duncombe, daughter of John Duncombe of Weston, Surry. He matriculated  at Wadham College, Oxford, in 1666 and was awarded a BA in 1670, and in the same year was admitted at the Middle Temple. In 1673, he inherited Chilworth Manor from his father. In 1677, he was called to the bar. He married Anne Gould, the daughter and coheiress of Sir Thomas Gould, draper, of Aldermanbury, Londonby licence dated 5 February 1678.

Randyll was elected a Member of Parliament for Guildford in October 1679 and again in 1681. He was selected High Sheriff of Surrey for the year 1686 to 1687 and served as a Deputy-lieutenant of the county from February to October 1688 and from 1702 onwards. He was returned again for Guildford in 1690, 1695, 1698, February 1701, December 1701, 1702, 1708, 3 February 1711 and 1713. He was returned again at Guildford unopposed at the 1715 British general election but the cumulative  cost of his electioneering forced him to sell his property in Chilworth in 1720. He stood for Guildford for the last time at the 1722 British general election, but was defeated in a contest.  In due course, he was committed to a debtors' prison.

Randyll died in obscurity sometime after 1735, leaving two daughters, one of whom married Gilbert Vane, 2nd Baron Barnard.

References

1649 births
18th-century deaths
People from Surrey
Alumni of Wadham College, Oxford
Members of the Middle Temple
English MPs 1679
English MPs 1681
English MPs 1690–1695
English MPs 1695–1698
English MPs 1698–1700
English MPs 1701
English MPs 1702–1705
Members of the Parliament of England for Guildford
British MPs 1708–1710
British MPs 1710–1713
British MPs 1713–1715
British MPs 1715–1722
High Sheriffs of Surrey
Deputy Lieutenants of Surrey